Manjural Islam can refer to either of two Bangladeshi cricketers:

 Mohammad Manjural Islam (born 1979)
 Manjural Islam Rana (1984–2007)